Kjell Noreik (28 July 1929 – 1 January 2015) was a Norwegian physician. He was born in Oslo. He was appointed professor of social medicine at the University of Oslo from 1986 to 1999. He was frequently used as an expert forensic psychiatrist, and was a member of the Norwegian Board of Forensic Medicine. He resided at Slependen.

References

1929 births
2015 deaths
Physicians from Oslo
Academic staff of the University of Oslo
Norwegian psychiatrists
Forensic psychiatrists